Michele Zackheim is an American writer and visual artist, and the author of four books.

Violette's Embrace: A Novel (Riverhead Books, 1996), is a fictional biography of the French writer Violette Leduc. Her second book, non-fiction, Einstein's Daughter: The Search for Lieserl (Penguin Putnam, 1999), follows the mystery of the lost illegitimate daughter of Mileva and Albert Einstein. Broken Colors (Europa Editions, 2007) is the story of an artist, whose life takes her to a place where life and art intersect. Her next book, a novel, Last Train to Paris (Europa Editions, 2014) and explores aging and love. Zackheim has also worked in the visual arts as a fresco muralist, an installation artist, print-maker, and a painter. She has also been the recipient of two NEA awards and is teaching at the School of Visual Arts in New York City.

References

American women novelists
20th-century American novelists
Living people
Year of birth missing (living people)
21st-century American novelists
20th-century American women writers
21st-century American women writers
American women non-fiction writers
20th-century American non-fiction writers
21st-century American non-fiction writers
Place of birth missing (living people)